The King George River is a perennial river located in the Kimberley region of Western Australia.

Location and features
The headwaters of the river rise to the west of the Ashton Range and flow in a northerly direction through the Drysdale River National Park past the Seppelt Range, joined by one minor tributary before 
The river descends  over its  course, including a  descent over the dual drop waterfall of King George Falls, approximately  upriver from the river mouth.

The area surrounding the falls are popular with tourists, who typically view the falls by boat. The falls are in full force from late December through to early May each year and gradually recede to a small flow in September. The falls were featured in Baz Luhrmann's 2008 film, Australia.

Etymology
The river was named in 1911 by explorer Charles Conigrave after a privately funded expedition in the area. The river is named in honour of King George V.

The traditional owners of the areas around the river are the Miwa people.

See also

References

External links

Rivers of the Kimberley region of Western Australia